Sergei Zakharovich Aslamazyan, also Aslamazian (27 January 1897 – 27 September 1978) was a Soviet Armenian cellist, composer, People's Artist of Armenian SSR (1945), awarded  the Stalin Prize (1946). He was a co-founder and a member of Komitas Quartet from 1925 to 1968. He was the author of quartet versions of Komitas works. From 1947 he was a professor at Moscow State Conservatory.

Selected works
 Melodie for viola and piano
 Suite on Armenian Folk Songs for string quartet (1950)
 Variations on a Theme by Paganini for string quartet (1961)

1897 births
1978 deaths
Armenian cellists
Armenian classical cellists
Armenian composers
Armenian musicians
Recipients of the USSR State Prize
Soviet composers
20th-century cellists